Oshkosh Township may refer to the following townships in the United States:

 Oshkosh Township, Yellow Medicine County, Minnesota
 Oshkosh Township, Wells County, North Dakota